Asura phantasma is a moth of the family Erebidae that is found in India.

References

Hampson, 1912. Moths of India. Journal of the Bombay Natural History Society V.21.Plate G

phantasma
Moths described in 1907
Moths of Asia